Ancylocirrus is a genus of acoels belonging to the family Isodiametridae.

Species:
 Ancylocirrus ornatus Kozloff, 2000

References

Acoelomorphs